The Arts Marketing Association (AMA) is a membership organisation for those working in the arts, culture and heritage sector.

Overview
The AMA is a membership organisation with approximately 3,500 members working at various levels across the arts, culture and heritage sector, predominantly in marketing, audience development, audience engagement and leadership roles. The organisation was set up in 1993 and is based in Cambridge, United Kingdom and provides professional development and training opportunities for its members and those working in the sector.

Conference
The AMA holds an annual conference, held in a different UK city every year. Previous conference locations include NewcastleGateshead in 2019, Liverpool in 2018 and Belfast in 2017. The 2020 conference due to take place in London was cancelled due to the COVID-19 pandemic.

References

Arts organisations based in the United Kingdom